Luke Plunket, 3rd Earl of Fingall (1639–1684) was an Irish soldier and politician. He was one of the signatories of the Catholic Remonstrance of 1661.

Birth and origins 
Luke was born in 1639 in Ireland. He was the eldest son of Christopher Plunket and his wife Mabel Barnewall. His father was the 2nd Earl of Fingall (since 1637). As the eldest son, Luke held from birth on the courtesy title of Baron of Killeen. His father's family was Old English and attested in Ireland since the 11th century.

Luke's mother was the daughter of Nicholas Barnewall, 1st viscount Kingsland, and Lady Bridget FitzGerald. His parents had married in January 1636. Lucas had four brothers and one sister, who are listed in his father's article.

Early life 
His father fought for the insurgents in the Irish Rebellion of 1641 and the Irish Confederate Wars. After the dissolution of the Irish Catholic Confederation in 1649, he continued his fight in the Royalist Alliance against the Parliamentarians during the Cromwellian Conquest. On 2 August 1649 his father fought under James Butler, 1st Duke of Ormond at the Battle of Rathmines for the Royalist alliance against the Parliamentarians. He was wounded and taken prisoner by the Parliamentarians. He died two weeks later of his wounds while in captivity at Dublin Castle. 

Killeen succeeded his father as 3rd Earl of Fingall in August 1649 at the age of about ten. His father's estates were forfeited by the Parliamentarians.

Marriage and children 
Some time before 1666, Fingall married Margaret MacCarty, second daughter of Donough MacCarthy, 1st Earl of Clancarty and Eleanor Butler.

 
Luke and Margaret had three sons (of which the elder two died young and are not known by name):
 Peter (1678–1718), his successor

—and three daughters:
 Elizabeth, married to Rowland Eyre, Esq., of Hassop, Derbyshire, and of Estwell in Staffordshire
 Helena, married first in 1681 to Sir FitzGerald Aylmer, Baronet, of Donadea in County Kildare and secondly to Michael Fleming, Esq., of Staholmog in County Meath
 Amelia, married Theobald Taaffe, 4th Earl of Carlingford, the last earl of Carlingford

The marriage was a troubled one, giving constant anxiety to friends and family. The couple seem to have spent much time apart.

Later life 
In December 1661 Lord Fingall was one of the signatories of the Catholic Remonstrance and presented the document personally to James Butler, 1st Duke of Ormond, for submission to the king.

Litigation over the recovery of his estates before the Court of Claims dragged on for years, causing one of the commissioners for claims to remark that Lord Fingall's case "was suspended between Heaven and earth". He had recovered most of his estates by 1677. Though he had been politically prominent in the 1660s, he seems to have spent his later years in retirement. During the Popish Plot Lady Fingall, who was living apart from her husband in London, was named as a Catholic conspirator, but no action was taken against her.

Death and timeline 
Fingall died in 1684 and was succeeded by his eldest son Peter.

Notes and references

Notes

Citations

Sources 

 
  – D to F (for Fingall)
  – N to R (for Ormond)
  – Eardley of Spalding to Goojerat (for Fingall)
 
  – Scotland and Ireland
 
 
  – (for his father)
  – (for timeline)
 
  – Viscounts, barons
  – House of Lords
 

 

1639 births
1684 deaths
17th-century Irish people
Earls of Fingall
People from County Meath